Ireland participated at the 2018 Summer Youth Olympics in Buenos Aires, Argentina from 6 October to 18 October 2018.

Badminton

Ireland qualified one player based on the Badminton Junior World Rankings.

Singles

Team

Boxing

Boys

Girls

Golf

Individual

Team

Gymnastics

Ireland qualified one gymnast based on its performance at the 2018 European Junior Championship.

 Girls' artistic individual all-around – 1 quota

Karate

Ireland qualified one contestant
 Boys' +68 kg - Sean McCarthy

Swimming

Tennis

References

2018 in Irish sport
Nations at the 2018 Summer Youth Olympics
Ireland at the Youth Olympics